Metapress was a digital content publishing company that produced and distributed online content on a wide array of subjects. Its website said, "We work to integrate content, community and commerce across a number of categories, providing people with actionable advice to achieve greater insights into the subjects they find most interesting." It further said it is a "resource of expert content on the internet". It also created, managed, monetized, and distributed published resources. As of September 24, 2019 it is no longer active.

See also 
 List of online magazines
 Online newspaper
 Content marketing

References

External links 
 

Online publishing companies of the United States